The 1953–54 Scottish Division B was won by Motherwell who, along with second placed Kilmarnock, were promoted to First Division A. Dumbarton finished bottom and were relegated to Division C.

Table

References 

 Scottish Football Archive

Scottish Division Two seasons
2
Scot